David Currie is a Canadian conductor who was the music director and conductor for the Ottawa Symphony Orchestra from 1992 until 2016. Currie is also an assistant professor at the University of Ottawa, where he teaches double bass and conducting, and conducts the university orchestra.

Career
Currie is a graduate of the University of Michigan and the Interlochen Arts Academy. Prior to joining the OSO, he was a double bass player in the National Arts Centre Orchestra from 1971 until 1991, when he retired as Principal Bass.

Currie studied conducting in Siena, Italy and at the Toho Gakuen School of Music in Tokyo, one of Japan's most prestigious private music institutions, where he studied with Professor Morihiro Okabe and Maestro Kazuyoshi Akiyama. Since 1982, Mr. Currie has also been the conductor of the University of Ottawa Orchestra.

He is the founding conductor of the Tabaret Ensemble, a string ensemble of seven professors and seven music students from the University of Ottawa. He is also the founding conductor of the Pierrot Ensemble, a group that performs 20th-century music. 
Currie has acted as a guest conductor for Ottawa's National Arts Centre Orchestra, and for Ottawa's opera company (Opera Lyra Ottawa).

In May 1992, Currie became Music Director of the Ottawa Symphony Orchestra. As music director, his duties include leading rehearsals, conducting the orchestra concerts, planning the programs, and engaging in community outreach activities. He stepped down in 2016.

Personal
Currie is married to Nancy Currie, an Ottawa-based visual artist and arts teacher, and the couple have two daughters (now adults).

References

External links
Profile of David Currie, from Ottawa Symphony

Male conductors (music)
Canadian classical musicians
Living people
Musicians from Ottawa
Toho Gakuen School of Music alumni
University of Michigan alumni
Academic staff of the University of Ottawa
21st-century Canadian conductors (music)
Year of birth missing (living people)
21st-century Canadian male musicians